M. Butterfly is a play by David Henry Hwang. The story, while entwined with that of the opera Madama Butterfly, is based most directly on the relationship between French diplomat Bernard Boursicot and Shi Pei Pu, a Peking opera singer. The play premiered on Broadway in 1988 and won the 1988 Tony Award for Best Play. In addition to this, it was a Pulitzer Prize for Drama finalist in 1989.

Productions
M. Butterfly premiered at the National Theatre, Washington, DC, on February 10, 1988.

The play opened on Broadway at the Eugene O'Neill Theatre on March 20, 1988, and closed after 777 performances on January 27, 1990. It was produced by Stuart Ostrow and directed by John Dexter; it starred John Lithgow as Gallimard and BD Wong as Song Liling. David Dukes, Anthony Hopkins, Tony Randall, and John Rubinstein played Gallimard at various times during the original run. 

The play was a 1989 finalist for the Pulitzer Prize for Drama.

A highly unusual abstract staging, featuring Puccini's opera Madame Butterfly intermixed with French pop music, had Kazakh countertenor Erik Kurmangaliev star as Song; he also sang two of Butterfly's arias live during the show. This production was directed by Roman Viktyuk in Moscow, Russia and ran from 1990 to 1992.

It is published by Plume and in an acting edition by Dramatists Play Service. An audio recording of the play was produced by L.A. Theatre Works, with Lithgow and Wong reprising their Broadway roles along with Margaret Cho.

A Broadway revival opened on October 26, 2017, at the Cort Theatre, with previews beginning on October 7. Starring Clive Owen and Jin Ha, the production was directed by Julie Taymor. David Henry Hwang made changes to the original text for the revival, mostly centering on the issue of intersectional identities, but also for clarifications.

Plot
The first act introduces the main character, René Gallimard, a civil servant attached to the French embassy in China. In a prison, Gallimard is serving a sentence for treason. Through a series of flashbacks and imagined conversations, Gallimard tells an audience his story about a woman that he loved and lost. He falls in love with a beautiful Chinese opera singer, Song Liling. Gallimard is unaware that all female roles in traditional Beijing opera were actually played by men, as women were banned from the stage. The first act ends with Gallimard returning to France in shame and living alone after he asks his wife, Helga, for a divorce, admitting to her that he's had a mistress. 

In act two it is revealed that Song had been acting as a spy for the Chinese government, and she is actually a man who has disguised himself as a woman to seduce Gallimard and extract information from him. They stay together for 20 years until the truth is revealed, and Gallimard is convicted of treason and imprisoned. Unable to face the fact that his "perfect woman" is a man, he retreats deep within himself and his memories. The action of the play is depicted as his disordered, distorted recollection of the events surrounding their affair. 

In act three, Song reveals himself to the audience as a man, without makeup and dressed in men's clothing. Gallimard claims he only loved the idea of Butterfly, never Song himself. Gallimard throws Song and his clothing off the stage, but holds onto Butterfly's kimono. In scene three, the setting returns to Gallimard's prison cell, as he puts on makeup and Butterfly's wig and kimono. Then he stabs himself, committing suicide just as Butterfly does in the opera.

Changes for 2017 Broadway revival
Hwang revisited the text for the Julie Taymor-directed 2017 revival, largely to incorporate further information that had emerged about the Boursicot case, and address intersectional identities. Changes include:

Song Liling initially presents as male to Gallimard, only to claim to be physically female but made to dress up as a man by her parents.
Hwang noted in an interview that the surprise reveal that Song Liling is actually a man no longer carried the shock value it did in 1988, especially after The Crying Game used the same tactic only a few years later.
The show is changed to a two-act structure.
Act 1 ends with Song telling Gallimard that she is pregnant (this moment originally occurred during Act 2).
Further information on how Song Liling managed to mislead Gallimard even while they were intimate.

Film adaptation 

Hwang adapted the play for a 1993 film directed by David Cronenberg with Jeremy Irons and John Lone in the leading roles.

Opera adaptation 
Chinese-American composer and colleague Huang Ruo used the play as the libretto for his opera which premiered in July 2022 at Santa Fe Opera.

Reception
Subhash Kak describes the interplay between the 1904 Madame Butterfly and 1988 M. Butterfly saying that Gallimard "falls in love, not with a person, but an imagined stereotype. His Chinese lover, Song Liling, encourages this stereotype, playing the role of the Oriental woman as demure and submissive. Gallimard, who had thought of himself as the macho Pinkerton, husband of the beautiful and fragile Butterfly." KBPS described the latter as an inversion of the former: "here, it is the Occidental man who becomes the Butterfly: submissive, easily trapped, and ultimately destroyed."

John Gross called it "a mess, intellectually speaking" but also "very well worth seeing".

Relevance to the LGBT community 
In an interview with David Henry Hwang, the playwright states: “The lines between gay and straight become very blurred in this play, but I think he knows he's having an affair with a man. Therefore, on some level he is gay.” 

In a 2014 review for the Windy City Times, Jonathan Abarbanel states that Song Liling “may be gay but it's a secondary point raised only as a way by which Chinese government agents can control him. As an exploration of sexuality, it's about the Divine Androgyne who Song Liling may recognize and exploit, and which Gallimard certainly recognizes and embraces in the play's closing moments.” 

The Washington Blade refers to Gallimard as “a gay man who couldn’t be himself. He had to mask behind male bravado, cultural and religious dicta, and diplomatic constraints. But he was willing to overlook and deny everything in pursuit of love.” 

Hwang talked to several people with nonconforming gender identities to get better insight into the character of Song, but he ultimately stressed that the character is not transgender. “He recognized how Song might be differently received by a modern audience more savvy about the wide spectrum of gender identity.” 

Ilka Saal writes: “The playwright uses the figure of the transvestite to lay bare the construction and performativity of gender and culture. Yet he stops short of questioning compulsory heterosexuality at its base, and thereby fails to use queer desire in order to open up interstices, categories of 'thirdness,' in this tight homophobic structure.”

In an article for Pride Source, Pruett and Beer state: “Gallimard is a man who thinks he is heterosexual, but is in fact a practicing homosexual for 20 years. Song takes on the role of a woman, but always self-identifies as a gay man, not a transgendered person.” 

Christian Lewis, when writing about the 2017 revival, wrote in the Huffington post that “this production does not explore any foray into non-binary or transgender identities, which is perhaps its one major flaw.”

Awards and nominations

Original Broadway production

References

External links

 
 

1988 plays
Broadway plays
Plays by David Henry Hwang
Drama Desk Award-winning plays
LGBT-related plays
Tony Award-winning plays
Plays set in China
Cross-dressing in literature